Appias paulina, the common albatross, Christmas Island white or Ceylon lesser albatross, is a butterfly of the family Pieridae. It is found from India to Samoa, including Indonesia, Japan, Malaysia, New Caledonia, Sri Lanka, Thailand and Australia.

The wingspan is about 50 mm.

The larvae feed on Drypetes australasica, Drypetes deplanchei and Alchornea ilicifolia.

Subspecies

Appias paulina galene (Ceylon)
Appias paulina distanti
Appias paulina griseoides (southern Vietnam)
Appias paulina grisea 
Appias paulina galathea (Andamans, Nicobars)
Appias paulina minato (Japan, Taiwan)
Appias paulina ega (Northern Territory to Cape York)
Appias paulina paula (Wetar)
Appias paulina eurosundana (Timor)
Appias paulina zoe (Moluccas)
Appias paulina falcidia (Biak)
Appias paulina saina (West Irian to Papua)
Appias paulina cynisca (Buru)
Appias paulina micromalayana (eastern Java, Bawean, Tenimber)

External links
Butterflies of Pieridae in Australia
Malaysian Butterflies

Appias (butterfly)
Butterflies of Java
Butterflies described in 1777